Kätlin Sepp (born 8 August 1992) is an Estonian backstroke, butterfly and freestyle swimmer. She is 34-time long course and 51-time short course Estonian swimming champion. She has broken 29 Estonian records in swimming.

Personal
Her sister Sigrid Sepp is also a swimmer.

References

1992 births
Living people
Swimmers from Tallinn
Estonian female backstroke swimmers
Estonian female butterfly swimmers
Estonian female freestyle swimmers
21st-century Estonian women
Estonian swimming coaches